Luís Ángel Cabrera Machado (born 20 May 1995) is a Venezuelan boxer. Cabrera competed in the men's lightweight event at the 2016 Summer Olympics.

Competing in the same weight class, he won a silver medal in at the 2018 South American Games and a bronze medal at the 2019 Pan American Games.

Notes

References

External links
 
 
 
 

1995 births
Living people
Venezuelan male boxers
Olympic boxers of Venezuela
Boxers at the 2016 Summer Olympics
Place of birth missing (living people)
South American Games silver medalists for Venezuela
South American Games medalists in boxing
Competitors at the 2018 South American Games
Boxers at the 2019 Pan American Games
Pan American Games bronze medalists for Venezuela
Pan American Games medalists in boxing
Lightweight boxers
Medalists at the 2019 Pan American Games
20th-century Venezuelan people
21st-century Venezuelan people